The Great Storm of 1975 (also known as the Super Bowl Blizzard, Minnesota's Storm of the Century, or the Tornado Outbreak of January, 1975) was an intense storm system that impacted a large portion of the Central and Southeast United States from January 9 to January 12, 1975. This storm remains one of the worst blizzards to ever strike parts of the Midwest, as well as one of the largest January tornado outbreaks on record in the United States.

Meteorological synopsis
The storm originated over the Pacific Ocean and crashed into the Northwest Pacific coast with damaging gale-force winds on January 8, 1975. By January 9 it had cleared the Rocky Mountains and began to redevelop and strengthen. At the same time, Arctic air was being drawn southward from Canada into the Great Plains, and large amounts of warm tropical air from the Gulf of Mexico were being pulled northward into much of the eastern U.S. The storm was a classic Panhandle Hook which moved from Colorado into Oklahoma before turning northward towards the Upper Midwest. It produced record low barometric pressure readings in the Midwest, with the pressure falling to an estimated 28.38 in (961 mb) just north of the Minnesota border in Canada.

Tornado outbreak

Tornado summary event

An unusual feature of this outbreak was that daytime heating, typically a key ingredient in the formation of tornadoes, had very little impact on their development. Rather, as the storm system pulled out into the central plains, strong thunderstorms and tornadoes quickly began to form despite the late hours. The first two tornadoes touched down after 10:00 p.m. CST on January 9 in Oklahoma and Louisiana. From there the progression of the twisters shifted eastward through the overnight and early morning hours, setting the stage for what would turn out to be a record-setting day on January 10. Texas saw five tornadoes between 1:30 a.m.–3:30 a.m., one tornado touched down in Arkansas at 6:00 a.m., Louisiana saw seven tornadoes between 5:30 a.m.–8:00 a.m. (killing one person), Mississippi had five tornadoes between 8:15 a.m.–10:00 a.m. (killing nine), and Illinois and Indiana each experienced three lunch-hour tornadoes. The tornadic line of storms then shifted into Alabama (killing one) and Florida during the afternoon and evening hours.

Mississippi and Alabama were the two states hardest hit by this outbreak. Alabama had the most twisters of any state with 13, but Mississippi saw the largest and deadliest tornado. An F4 tornado that tore through Pike, Lincoln, Lawrence, and Simpson Counties at 8:14 a.m. killed nine people and injured over 200, and severely damaged 38 blocks in the town of McComb. The 39 tornadoes on January 10 marked the most active tornadic day in January in U.S. history at that time. The 52 tornadoes during January 1975 also set a U.S. record for the most tornadoes during that month. Both of these records were broken in January 1999.

After a calm day on January 11, four more tornadoes touched down in Florida and Georgia on January 12, killing one person in Florida. By the time the outbreak ended it had produced 45 tornadoes, killed 12 people, injured 377 and caused $42 million in damages.

Confirmed tornadoes

January 9 event

January 10 event

January 12 event

Blizzard
As the storm system began to move northeastward out of Oklahoma, the cool air behind pulled down behind the system interacted with the moisture being pulled northward to produce snow over a large part of the Midwest. The snow began falling on Friday, January 10 and continued for the next two days. The heaviest snow fell to the west of the low pressure center, which tracked from northeast Iowa through central Minnesota up to Lake Superior.

Sioux Falls, South Dakota saw visibilities of below  for 24 straight hours, and just east of Sioux Falls a 2,000-foot (610 m) broadcast tower collapsed under the storm's fury.  In Willmar, Minnesota, 168 passengers were trapped in a stranded train for hours, unable to walk to shelter because of dangerously low wind chill values. In Omaha, Nebraska a foot (31 cm) of snow fell, Sioux Falls saw , Duluth, Minnesota saw , and International Falls, Minnesota saw .

Record low pressures were recorded in communities in Nebraska, Minnesota, Illinois, and Wisconsin, with a low of 28.55 in (966.8 mb) in Duluth, Minnesota. Approximately 58 people died from effects of the blizzard and over 100,000 farm animals were lost. The combination of snowfall totals, wind velocities, and cold temperatures made this one of the most severe blizzards the Upper Midwest has experienced.

Record events
This storm system had, in part, a large effect on the weather in the entire eastern half of the country. A number of different weather records (at the time) were set during the four days of this storm, especially in daily high temperatures, wind gusts, low barometric pressure readings, and number of tornadoes.

Daily high temperatures

January 10
 Chicago: 60 °F (15.6 °C)
 Indianapolis, Indiana: 62 °F (16.7 °C)
 Louisville, Kentucky: 66 °F (18.9 °C)
 South Bend, Indiana: 61 °F (16.1 °C)

January 11
 New York City: 65 °F (18.3 °C)
 Providence, Rhode Island: 61 °F (16.1 °C)
 Washington, D.C.: 75 °F (23.9 °C)

Low pressure measurements
 Duluth, Minnesota: 28.55 in (966.8 mb)
 Minneapolis, Minnesota: 28.62 in (969.2 mb)
 Rochester, Minnesota: 28.67 in (970.9 mb)
 Milwaukee, Wisconsin: 28.86 in (977.3 mb)
 Rockford, Illinois: 28.87 in (977.6 mb)
 St. Louis, Missouri: 28.93 in (979.7 mb)

Tornadoes
 Most tornadoes on one day in January: 39
 Most tornadoes in the United States during January:  52

See also
 List of Minnesota weather records
 List of North American tornadoes and tornado outbreaks

References

Bibliography

External links
 Brainerd Daily Dispatch front page, January 11, 1975

Blizzards in the United States
F4 tornadoes by date
 ,1975-01-09
1975 meteorology
1975 natural disasters in the United States
Tornadoes of 1975
Tornadoes in Alabama
Tornadoes in Florida
Tornadoes in Mississippi
Natural disasters in Iowa
Natural disasters in Minnesota
Natural disasters in Nebraska
Natural disasters in South Dakota
Natural disasters in Omaha, Nebraska
1975 in Alabama
1975 in Florida
1975 in Mississippi
January 1975 events in North America